Events from the year 1504 in Ireland.

Incumbent
Lord: Henry VII

Events
August 19 – Battle of Knockdoe: Gearóid Mór FitzGerald, 8th Earl of Kildare, Lord Deputy of Ireland, defeats Ulick Fionn Burke, the Clanricarde.
First known record of a Solicitor-General for Ireland.

Births

Deaths

References

 
1500s in Ireland
Ireland
Years of the 16th century in Ireland